The Buy Nothing Project is a global conglomeration of community-based groups, founded in Bainbridge Island, Washington, in 2013, that encourages giving (or recycling) of consumer goods and services (called "gifts of self") in preference to conventional commerce. The stated aim of the Buy Nothing Project is to "set the scarcity model of our cash economy aside in favor of creatively and collaboratively sharing the abundance around us". It began as a Facebook campaign and has built up local groups in the US and other countries, claiming over 4,000 volunteers.

Global and local impact 
On a local level, each Buy Nothing Project group may contribute significantly to local waste prevention and waste reduction efforts, but the actual impact of local Buy Nothing Project groups has not been measured or surveyed.

The project website notes that because the map of groups was based on existing neighborhood boundaries, and those boundaries have been influenced by socioeconomic differences and practices such as redlining, the map "began to align with unjust boundaries, including historic redlining, and this alignment amplified these injustices". In the summer of 2020, the project went through an "equity overhaul" to diversify the local groups. The leader of one in Minneapolis, Minnesota said, "It's been hard to diversify our groups, because our groups reflect our neighborhoods and our neighborhoods are largely segregated in Minneapolis".

Organization and goals 
The Buy Nothing Project encourages local communities to focus on improving the community in which they live and keep groups small and local to minimise distance travelled to pick up items. There is no overt criticism of consumerism, but the project's goals include saving money and reducing waste. The projects' co-founders, Rebecca Rockefeller and Liesl Clark, say that it is not just recycling: it is a way to fuel the gift economy and build community.

Members are expected to follow the rules and mission statement of the project, although some groups and group leaders tailor the rules to better suit their local community of the type of project they wish to coordinate.

Membership is restricted to persons of legal age as prescribed by the laws of each group's geographic location.

References

External links 
 Official website of Buy Nothing Project

Recycling organizations
DIY culture
Anti-consumerist groups